Pushin' On is Quantic Soul Orchestra's second full-length release. The singer Alice Russell performs on several of the album's tracks. The title track is featured in the pilot episode of Californication and the 2008 film Strange Wilderness.

Track listing 
 "Introducing...The Quantic Soul Orchestra" -  2:35 
 "West Pier Getdown" -  4:17 
 "Pushin' On" -  3:19 
 "That Goose on My Grave" -  3:48 
 "Feeling Good" -  3:52 
 "Conspirator (Main Theme)" -  3:32 
 "Hands of My Love" -  2:45 
 "Hold On Tight" -  4:21 
 "Get a Move On" -  3:35 
 "Paintings and Journeys" -  3:27 
 "End of the Road" -  3:26

References

2005 albums
Will Holland albums